Wilhelm Marie "Wim" Hennings (20 August 1905 – 24 September 1991) was a Dutch sprinter. He competed in the 100 m event at the 1928 Summer Olympics, but failed to reach the final.

References

1905 births
1991 deaths
Dutch male sprinters
Athletes (track and field) at the 1928 Summer Olympics
Olympic athletes of the Netherlands
Athletes from Amsterdam
20th-century Dutch people